Amer Abdul Wahab  (born 17 April 1969 in Basra) is a former Iraqi football goalkeeper. He was nicknamed Al Emlak ("The Giant").

Coaching career

In 2002 he got the job of goalkeeper coach for his former club Al-Zawra'a, then went on to goalkeeper coach the Iraq national football team at the 2009 FIFA Confederations Cup, then goalkeeper coach the Cypriot club Apollon Limassol. In 2007, he moved to the UAE club Al-Sharjah.

He joined Al-Ain Club in UAE in 2009, becoming a goalkeeper club coach.

Honours

Player

Club
Al-Zawra'a:
Iraqi Premier League: 1991; 1994; 1995; 1996; 2000; 2001.
Iraq FA Cup: 1991; 1993; 1994; 1995; 1996; 1999; 2001.
Iraqi Super Cup: 2000.

References

External links
 
 International statistics at rsssf
 Amer Abdul Wahab clips: Interview with Abdul Wahab in 2014
Al-Minaa Club: Sailors of south

1969 births
Living people
Sportspeople from Basra
Iraqi footballers
Association football goalkeepers
Al-Mina'a SC players
Al-Zawraa SC players
Al Ahed FC players
Racing Club Beirut players
Al-Riyadh SC players
Iraq international footballers
2000 AFC Asian Cup players
Iraqi expatriate footballers
Iraqi expatriate sportspeople in Lebanon
Iraqi expatriate sportspeople in Cyprus
Iraqi expatriate sportspeople in the United Arab Emirates
Expatriate footballers in Lebanon
Lebanese Premier League players